The Marshall Islands competed at the 2010 Summer Youth Olympics, the inaugural Youth Olympic Games, held in Singapore from 14 August to 26 August 2010.

Swimming

Weightlifting

References

External links
Competitors List: Marshall Islands – Singapore 2010 official site

2010 in Marshallese sports
Nations at the 2010 Summer Youth Olympics
Marshall Islands at the Youth Olympics